This is a list of compositions by Viktor Kosenko, who composed about 250 works in various genres. His piano music may be considered post-romantic, containing eclectic elements of musical nationalism. Although a particular folk song has never been directly cited in his work, his melodic and harmonic lines are definitely associated with Ukrainian folk songs, and also with the Dorian, Lydian, and Phrygian mode used extensively in his compositions. Kosenko left a dozen works that are included in the hall of Ukrainian piano music. Among these are his Eleven Études in the Form of Old Dances, Op. 19, and Twenty-four Pieces for Children, Op. 25, which grew generations of young pianists. After his death, many of his other works, if not in manuscript, have been published only recently.

Both tables (works with and without opus number) are sortable by title, key, tempo and mood markings (if applicable), year of production or publishing (when applicable), and non-sortable by opus number (some do not have one), name, image (scores), genre, notes and references. This line _ functions as a chronological divider for three parts of Kosenko's life (his early works, the time he spent in Zhytomir, and the one spent in Kiev) when his compositions are sorted by year.

Genres

Works with opus number

Works without opus number

Additional information

Notes

References

External links

 

Lists of compositions by composer
Piano compositions in the 20th century